As of 2012, illegal immigration in Libya has become a major port to enter Europe. The Libyan government has been criticised for breaching illegal immigrants rights during the deportation of people .

References

Society of Libya
Libya
Libya